Daniel Adam z Veleslavína (literally translated Daniel Adam of Veleslavín; 31 August 1546 – 18 October 1599), was a Czech lexicographer, publisher, translator, and writer. (Veleslavína is the genitive declension of Veleslavín, a district of today's Greater Prague)

Adam Veleslavín  studied at the University of Prague, and from 1569 to 1576 he was professor there. When he married the daughter of the publisher Jiří Melantrich z Aventina (1511–1580), he was forced to leave the university (professors were required to keep celibacy). He started working at the print press and later took it over.

He and his collaborators translated and published many historical, religious, and scientific books. Adam himself wrote only one book, the Kalendář historický (Historical Calendar, 1578 and 1590, an overview of European history).

Adam was a secret member of the Unity of the Brethren. His work of most impact was publishing a Czech translation of the Bible – the Bible kralická (six volumes, between 1579 and 1594). The language used in the translation was considered the best literary language in the Czech lands and in the area of today's Slovakia (the so-called bibličtina, Bible language).

See also 
 List of Czech writers
 Jiří Melantrich of Aventino

External links 
 Biography (in Czech)

1546 births
1599 deaths
16th-century Bohemian people
16th-century publishers (people)
16th-century writers
Writers from Prague
Czech publishers (people)
Czech male writers
Czech philosophers
Czech translators
Translators to Czech
Academic staff of Charles University
Charles University alumni
Czech lexicographers
Holy Roman Empire philosophers